Yelmer Evert Frans Buurman (born 19 February 1987) is a Dutch professional racing driver. He was 3rd in the Blancpain Endurance Series in 2013, and second in the FIA GT1 Championship in 2012. Besides achieving victories in those categories, also won several races in the Superleague Formula, and was second in the 2013 24 Hours of Nürburgring.

Career

Formula König
Born in Ubbergen, Gelderland, Buurman drove in the German-based Formula König championship in 2002, finishing twentieth in the season standings.

Formula Renault

Buurman concentrated on various Formula Renault championships from 2003 to 2005, competing in the British, Dutch, European and American series during this period. In the British Winter Series in 2003, he began a four-year association with the Fortec Motorsport team. His most successful FRenault championships were the 2003 British Winter Series and the 2004 Dutch season, finishing third in both.

In 2007, Buurman made a brief appearance for Fortec in the Formula Renault 3.5 Series, replacing the injured Richard Philippe for four races. At the second race weekend in which he replaced Philippe, he finished fifth and fourth in the two races.

Formula Three
Following two races in British Formula Three in 2005, Buurman concentrated on this formula for 2006 and 2007. In 2006, he finished in fourth place in the British championship and drove in four races in the Formula Three Euroseries for Fortec. In 2007, he switched to the Euroseries full-time with the Manor Motorsport team, taking sixth place in the championship. He also competed in the stand-alone Macau Grand Prix and Masters F3 events in both years.

GP2 Series

In 2008, Buurman competed in both the GP2 Series and the new GP2 Asia Series for the Arden team, alongside Sébastien Buemi. He was not originally scheduled to race in the Asian championship, but replaced Adam Langley-Khan when the Pakistani driver decided to focus on his A1 Grand Prix and education commitments and left the team after two rounds of the season.

After ten races of the GP2 Series season, Buurman was replaced at Arden by Luca Filippi, who had in turn lost his previous drive with the ART Grand Prix team to Sakon Yamamoto.

Buurman was signed by the newly renamed Ocean Racing Technology team for the remainder of the 2008–09 GP2 Asia Series season. He was replaced for the final round by Karun Chandhok however, but he finished 19th in the championship. He was recalled to the team for the final two rounds of the 2009–10 GP2 Asia Series season.

Superleague Formula
Following the loss of his GP2 drive, Buurman moved to the new Superleague Formula series as a driver for the PSV Eindhoven team. He finished in second position in the 2008 championship. For the 2009 season, he drove for the R.S.C. Anderlecht team. For 2010, Buurman will drive for his third different side, moving to the Atech Grand Prix-run A.C. Milan outfit.

Sports car racing
In 2011, Buurman debuted in the FIA GT1 Championship in the final round at Potrero de los Funes, with a Chevrolet Corvette C6.R of Exim Bank Team China, winning the two races.

Buurman became a full-time driver for Vitaphone in the FIA GT1 Championship in 2012 along with Michael Bartels; posted four wins, two seconds places, two thirds, two fourths and two fifths, so that finished fifth in the championship behind the pairings Marc Basseng / Markus Winkelhock and Stef Dusseldorp / Frédéric Makowiecki. He also contested in the 24 Hours of Le Mans and the 6 Hours of Castellet with a LMP2's car Lola B12/80, where he finished third in the Paul Ricard race.

Marc VDS Racing Team hired a Buurman to drive a BMW Z4 for the 2013 Blancpain Endurance Series, more precisely in the Pro Cup class, along with Maxime Martin and Bas Leinders. The trio won a race, so that finished fourth in the series. Furthermore, Buurman finished second in the 24 Hours of Nurburgring.

Buurman won the 2018 Blancpain GT Series Endurance Cup and the Pro-Am division of the 2020 British GT Championship.

Racing record

Career summary

Complete Formula Renault 3.5 Series results
(key) (Races in bold indicate pole position) (Races in italics indicate fastest lap)

Complete GP2 Series results
(key) (Races in bold indicate pole position) (Races in italics indicate fastest lap)

Complete GP2 Asia Series results
(key) (Races in bold indicate pole position) (Races in italics indicate fastest lap)

Superleague Formula

2008-2009
(Races in bold indicate pole position) (Races in italics indicate fastest lap)

2009 Super Final Results
Super Final results in 2009 did not count for points towards the main championship.

2010

Complete GT1 World Championship results

* Season still in progress.

24 Hours of Le Mans Results

References
Career statistics from driverdb.com.  Retrieved on April 9, 2008.

External links

Official website

1987 births
Living people
People from Ubbergen
Dutch racing drivers
GP2 Series drivers
British Formula Renault 2.0 drivers
Dutch Formula Renault 2.0 drivers
Formula Renault Eurocup drivers
North American Formula Renault drivers
British Formula Three Championship drivers
Formula 3 Euro Series drivers
Superleague Formula drivers
GP2 Asia Series drivers
World Series Formula V8 3.5 drivers
FIA GT1 World Championship drivers
24 Hours of Le Mans drivers
Blancpain Endurance Series drivers
ADAC GT Masters drivers
24 Hours of Spa drivers
24H Series drivers
British GT Championship drivers
Fortec Motorsport drivers
Manor Motorsport drivers
Arden International drivers
Ocean Racing Technology drivers
Status Grand Prix drivers
Sportspeople from Gelderland
Mercedes-AMG Motorsport drivers
Nürburgring 24 Hours drivers
Craft-Bamboo Racing drivers